Maharani may refer to:

 Maharani (TV series), 2009 Tamil TV serial
 Maharani (web series), 2021 Hindi political web series on SonyLIV
 Maharani (album), by Nikki Palikat, 2005